James Nunatak is a conical nunatak,  high, standing  south of Lewis Point on the east coast of Palmer Land, Antarctica. This feature was photographed from the air by members of the United States Antarctic Service (USAS) in September 1940 and was probably seen by the USAS ground party that explored this coast. During 1947 it was charted by a joint party consisting of members of the Ronne Antarctic Research Expedition and the Falkland Islands Dependencies Survey (FIDS), and was named by the FIDS for David P. James, a FIDS surveyor at the Hope Bay base in 1945–46.

See also
Graham Spur

References

Nunataks of Palmer Land